Sonya Douglass Horsford is an American academic who researches educational inequality in the United States, social justice, and education policy. Horsford is a professor of educational leadership at the Teachers College, Columbia University.

Life 
In 1997, Horsford completed a B.A. in communications and journalism, cum laude, at Colorado State University. She earned a M.P.A. (2002) and Ed.D. in educational leadership (2007) at University of Nevada, Las Vegas (UNLV). Her dissertation was titled Vestiges of desegregation: Black superintendent reflections on the complex legacy of Brown v Board of Education. Horsford's doctoral advisor was Edith A. Rusch.

Horsford researches educational inequality in the United States, social justice, and education policy. At UNLV, She was an assistant professor in the department of educational leadership at UNLV from 2008 to 2010 and a senior resident scholar of education from 2011 to 2013. From 2013 to 2016, Horsford was an associate professor in the graduate school of education at George Mason University. In 2016, Horsford joined the faculty at the Teachers College, Columbia University as an associate professor in the educational leadership program. In 2017, she became the Teachers College founding director of the Black Education Research Collective and co-director of the urban education leaders program. She became a full professor in the fall of 2021.

Horsford is married to politician Steven Horsford. They have three children.

Selected works

References

External links 
 

Living people
Year of birth missing (living people)
Place of birth missing (living people)
Colorado State University alumni
University of Nevada, Las Vegas alumni
University of Nevada, Las Vegas faculty
George Mason University faculty
Teachers College, Columbia University faculty
African-American women academics
American women academics
African-American academics
21st-century American women writers
21st-century American non-fiction writers
21st-century African-American women writers
21st-century African-American writers
21st-century American women educators
21st-century American educators